Larisa Marinenkova is a Moldovan powerlifter who has competed at three Summer Paralympics for her country, and won medals in the IPC Powerlifting Open European Championships and 2017 World Para Paralifting World Cup.

Career
As a child, Larisa Marienkova contracted polio, resulting in permanent muscle weakness. She eventually moved to sports, despite the lack of adapted facilities in Moldova. In 2008, she finished eight in her weight class at the 2008 Summer Paralympics in Beijing, China.
Marienkova won the bronze medal in her weight class at the International Paralympic Committee Powerlifting Open European Championships in 2013 at Aleksin, Russia.

She was selected as one of two members of the Moldovan team for the 2012 Summer Paralympics in London, England. However, she was unable to lift the standard weight set, something that she was severely disappointed about and drove her to compete at the following Games.

She finished seventh in her event at the 2016 Summer Paralympics in Rio de Janeiro, Brazil. The Government of Moldova gave her an additional 300,000 Moldovan leu because of her success at the Games. This was awarded some six months after it was initially announced, following a public complaint by fellow athlete Zalina Marghieva.

At the 2017 World Para Paralifting World Cup in Eger, Hungary, Marienkova finished in second place behind Egypt's Rehab Abougharbya.

References

Living people
Female powerlifters
Paralympic powerlifters of Moldova
Powerlifters at the 2008 Summer Paralympics
Powerlifters at the 2012 Summer Paralympics
Powerlifters at the 2016 Summer Paralympics
Year of birth missing (living people)
Powerlifters at the 2020 Summer Paralympics